Louise Marley is an American author of science fiction and fantasy. Her fiction often features strong female characters, and explores themes of hope, humanity, and faith in the distant future. Prior to her career as a writer, Marley was an opera singer with the Seattle Opera, and several of her books feature musical themes.

Marley also writes under the pseudonyms Cate Campbell, Toby Bishop, and most recently, Louisa Morgan.

Bibliography
The Singers of Nevya series
Sing the Light 1995
Sing the Warmth 1996
Receive the Gift 1997
Singer in the Snow  2005
Other Novels
The Terrorists of Irustan 1999
The Glass Harmonica 2000 (winner 2001 Endeavour Award)
The Maquisarde  2002
The Child Goddess   2004 (winner 2005 Endeavour Award)
Mozart's Blood 2010
The Brahms Deception 2010
The Glass Butterfly 2010
Benedict Hall 2013
Hall of Secrets 2014
A Secret History of Witches 2017
The Witch's Kind 2019
The Age of Witches 2020
Short Story Collections
Absalom’s Mother & Other Stories

References

External links
Official Website
Louise Marley Journal(blog)

Year of birth missing (living people)
Living people
20th-century American novelists
21st-century American novelists
American fantasy writers
American science fiction writers
American women short story writers
American women novelists
Endeavour Award winners
Women science fiction and fantasy writers
20th-century American women writers
21st-century American women writers
20th-century American short story writers
21st-century American short story writers